The Regional Council of Nord-Pas-de-Calais was the deliberative assembly of the former French region Nord-Pas-de-Calais, a decentralized territorial community acting on the regional territory. It sat between 2008 and its disappearance in 2014 at the Hôtel de Région Nord-Pas-de-Calais, located on avenue du Président-Hoover, in Lille.

It was chaired by April 13, 2001 to 2014 by socialist Daniel Percheron.

References 

Nord-Pas-de-Calais
Nord-Pas-de-Calais
2001 establishments in France
2014 disestablishments in France